Clara Ycart (born 10 January 1999) is a field hockey player from Spain, who plays as a defender.

Career

Club hockey
Ycart plays hockey for CD Terrassa in the División de Honor in Spain.

National teams

Under–18
In 2015 and 2016, Ycart was a member of the Spain U–18 at the EuroHockey Youth Championship, held in Santander and Cork respectively. At both tournaments Spain finished in fifth place.

Under–21
In 2016, Ycart was a member of the Spanish Under–21 team at the FIH Junior World Cup in Santiago.

She followed this up with an appearance at the 2017 EuroHockey Junior Championship in Valencia where the team finished fifth.

Red Sticks
Ycart made her debut for the Spanish national team, the 'Red Sticks', in 2017.

2019 was Ycart's most prominent year with the national side, winning her first medal with the team at the FIH Series Finals in Valencia, taking home gold. This was followed up with a bronze medal performance at the EuroHockey Championships in Antwerp.

References

External links
 
 
 
 

1999 births
Living people
Female field hockey defenders
Spanish female field hockey players
Field hockey players at the 2020 Summer Olympics
Olympic field hockey players of Spain